Live in Asbury Park is a Clarence Clemons and Temple of Soul album that was recorded live at The Stone Pony in Asbury Park, New Jersey on September 2–3, 2001.

Track listing

 "Washington Bond" – Clarence Clemons, Jimmy Dillon, Dan Shea  – 4:52
 "Small Things" – Bruce Springsteen - 3:08
 "CC Angel" - Clarence Clemons – 5:25
 "Sax In The City" – Clarence Clemons, John Colby – 4:02
 "Heat Of A Full Moon" – Billy Livesay, Dave Graham – 3:50
 "Jump Start My Heart" – Desmond Child, Jeff Kent, Ellie Greenwich  – 4:23
 "Livin Without You" - Clarence Clemons, John Colby – 4:54
 "Fatha John" - Clarence Clemons, John Colby – 3:54
 "Don’t Walk Away" - Clarence Clemons, Jimmy Dillon, Kevin Russell – 4:57
 "Paradise By The C" - Bruce Springsteen – 3:11
 "Road To Paradise" - Clarence Clemons, Jimmy Dillon, Dan Shea – 4:22
 "Savin’ Up" - Bruce Springsteen – 5:36

Personnel
 Produced by Clarence Clemons and John Colby
 Recorded and mixed by Toby Scott
 Clarence Clemons – saxophone, vocals, percussion
 Steve Argy – bass, vocals
 John Colby – piano, synthesizers, vocals
 Keith Cronin – drums
 Tomas Diaz – percussions, vocals
 Randi Fishenfeld – violin, vocals
 Billy Livesay – guitars, vocals
 Paul Pettitt  – organ, synthesizers, vocals
The Uptown Horns:
 Crispin Cioe  – alto, baritone sax
 Larry Etkin  – trumpet
 Bob Funk  – trombone
 Arno Hecht  – tenor sax

References

2002 live albums
Clarence Clemons albums
Asbury Park, New Jersey